Associazione Sportiva Dilettantistica Mori Santo Stefano, commonly referred to as Mori S. Stefano, is an Italian football club based in Mori, Trentino, Trentino-Alto Adige. Currently it plays in Italy's Eccellenza.

History

Foundation
The club was founded in 1989 after the merger of Unione Sportiva Mori (founded in 1945) and Gruppo Sportivo Santo Stefano (founded in 1961).

Serie D
In the season 2013–14 the team was promoted for the first time, from Eccellenza Trentino-Alto Adige to Serie D. However, the club relegated successively in 2015 and again in 2016.

Colors and badge
The team's colors are yellow, green and black.

References

External links
 Official homepage

Football clubs in Trentino-Alto Adige/Südtirol
Association football clubs established in 1989
1989 establishments in Italy